The Wakulla State Forest is in the U.S. state of Florida. The  forest is located in the panhandle, near Tallahassee; it includes a major tract in Wakulla County and a small tract, the former Woodville State Forest, in Leon County. The forest is also a Wildlife Management Area managed by the Florida Fish and Wildlife Conservation Commission.

See also

List of Florida state forests
List of Florida state parks

References

External links

 Wakulla State Forest: Florida Division of Forestry- FDACS

Florida state forests
Protected areas of Leon County, Florida
Protected areas of Wakulla County, Florida
Wildlife management areas of Florida